The John Leonard Prize for Best First Book, established in 2013, is an annual literary award presented by the National Book Critics Circle (NBCC) for authors' first books in any genre. Unlike other NBCC awards, recipients are selected by members, not the board.

The prize is named after John Leonard, a renowned literary critic and NBCC co-founder.

Recipients

See also 
 Ivan Sandrof Lifetime Achievement Award
 National Book Critics Circle Awards
 National Book Critics Circle Award for Biography
 National Book Critics Circle Award for Criticism
 National Book Critics Circle Award for Fiction
 National Book Critics Circle Award for Memoir and Autobiography
 National Book Critics Circle Award for Nonfiction
 National Book Critics Circle Award for Poetry
 Nona Balakian Citation for Excellence in Reviewing

References

External links 

 Official website

Awards established in 2013
American literary awards
21st-century literary awards